Stourbridge Junction is one of two railway stations serving the town of Stourbridge, in the Metropolitan Borough of Dudley in the West Midlands, England. It lies on the Birmingham to Worcester via Kidderminster Line and is the junction for the Stourbridge Town Branch Line, said to be the shortest operational branch line in Europe.

History
The station was opened in 1852  on the Oxford, Worcester and Wolverhampton Railway line, at a slightly different location from the present station, under the name of Stourbridge. The junction came about when the Stourbridge Railway built their line to Lye and beyond.

Stourbridge became a double junction on 1 October 1879 when the branch to Stourbridge Town and goods was opened. It was at this time that the station changed its name from Stourbridge to Stourbridge Junction. 

The new station  to the south of the original costing £100,000 was opened on 1 October 1901 by J.E. Jones, Vice-Chairman of Stourbridge Council. The traffic at this time comprised 150 passenger trains and 200 luggage trains per day.

On 17 February 1902 the 1.12pm passenger train from Wolverhampton to London was approaching Stourbridge Junction when it ran into a light engine which was standing at the home signal at Stourbridge Junction North signal box. Nine passengers were injured, and the driver and fireman of the light engine and the guard of the passenger train were cut or bruised. The report by Lieutenant Col. H.A. Yorke R.E. found that the blame lay on the signalman who forgot that there was an engine at the home signal and accepted the passenger train without checking that the line was clear. 

On 9 July 1920 a light engine (No. 497) collided with a goods train hauled by an 0-6-0 freight locomotive (No. 1015) injuring the guard of the goods train and derailing the brake van and eight goods wagons.

On Thursday 2 April 1931 a passenger train from Birmingham collided with three empty stationary coaches at the station. The train was running into the relief platform when the driver suddenly spotted the stationary coaches which had formed part of a local train earlier in the evening. The first of the three stationary coaches was completely destroyed and the other two were badly damaged. A few passengers on the passenger train received minor injuries. 

In 1962, the OWW was closed to passenger traffic north of Stourbridge by the British Transport Commission, although the route remained open for freight until 1993.  Only the section as far as the Round Oak Steel Terminal is still in use.

All through services to Birmingham were diverted from Snow Hill to Birmingham New Street in 1967 in the wake of the Beeching Report, but mostly reverted to their previous route following the reopening of the Smethwick Junction to Snow Hill line in 1995. Certain Birmingham - Worcester/Hereford trains calling here continued to use the connection onto the Stour Valley line at Galton Junction until the May 2004 timetable change, but there are now no timetabled direct services to New Street and passengers wishing to access main line services there must either change at Galton Bridge or make the transfer between Snow Hill (or Moor St) & New Street on foot.

The station used to have four platforms, comprising two island platforms. The southern divergence to Platform 1 was removed some years ago and Platform 4, situated opposite to the current Platform 3, now faces the car park - built on the station's old carriage sidings.

The station's signalbox closed on 24 August 2012, as part of a wider network modernisation programme to centralise signalling operations. The signals at the station are now controlled from the West Midlands Signalling Centre in Saltley, Birmingham.

Railway operations

Operations

Signalling

Signals in and around the station are controlled from the West Midlands Signalling Centre, which replaced Stourbridge's older box in 2012. The town branch is accessed from the 'goods loop' line and a manually operated ground frame located to the north of platforms 1 & 2.

Platforms

Platform 1 – Reserved for the Town branch line only
Platform 2 – For trains towards Birmingham, also used for terminating trains heading to Stratford-Upon-Avon only.
Platform 3 – Primarily for trains towards Kidderminster, but Birmingham bound trains can use this platform

A disused through-platform face can be seen next to platform 3, which is used as a station entrance and part of the car park.

Services

West Midlands Railway

The majority of services from Stourbridge Junction are operated by West Midlands Railway, using Class 172 diesel multiple units. They usually run to Birmingham Snow Hill via Smethwick Galton Bridge, and to Kidderminster, Worcester Shrub Hill or Great Malvern. Services in the West Midlands county are often subsidised by Network West Midlands.

Trains operating from the Junction to Stourbridge Town are currently being run by Class 139 units. One of two units operates a shuttle service every ten minutes between the stations. The service is called the Stourbridge Shuttle, and is operated by Pre Metro Operations, in partnership with West Midlands Railway. The Shuttle is renowned for being one of the shortest branch line services in Europe at 3/4 of a mile long. 

Other operators

Chiltern Railways provide a peak time service to and from London Marylebone via Birmingham Snow Hill, most of which commence at Kidderminster.

The station often sees special charter trains or stock movements to the Severn Valley Railway at Kidderminster, and two CrossCountry services - one early morning and one late evening - are timetabled to run through, but not call at, Stourbridge Junction. The line is also used as a diversionary route for the Cross Country Route between Birmingham New Street and Cheltenham Spa.

Freight
In the recent economic downturn freight through Stourbridge Junction has lessened significantly. There are now just three steel trains per day each way to and from Round Oak Steel Terminal. There are several other freight trains which use the line through the station on a regular basis.

Future Proposals & West Midland Metro line Extension 

Since 2010, plans have existed to reintroduce services on part of the disused Oxford, Worcester and Wolverhampton Railway (OWW) from Stourbridge Junction to Brierley Hill. Services would be operated by similar PPM stock that is used to Stourbridge Town, or the branch route may be expanded, these plans were later paused in place of the West Midlands Metro extension.

In 2012 the extension of the West Midlands Metro to from Wednesbury to Brierley hill had been given the go ahead.

Due to funding constraints, it was decided to terminate Line 2 in Brierley Hill, and later Stourbridge, with the first section from Wednesbury to Dudley opening first. In early 2017, work began to clear vegetation and disused track from the former railway line. The line will be completed by 2023. The estimated cost of Line 2 is now £449 million.

In 2021, large funding was given to the West Midlands Metro, and the extension to Stourbridge Town Centre & Stourbridge Junction was confirmed to be under development / planning. However, there is no estimated date of construction or completion. Once complete, trams will run on 3 lines to Walsall, Wolverhampton & Digbeth (in Central Birmingham)

Stourbridge depot
The depot was allocated with mainly local service tank engines, such as Prairies and Panniers, with a small allocation of dedicated freight types. The original OWW shed was later used to house railmotors and diesel railcars. With the Beeching Report implemented, both depots closed in July 1966 and were demolished, with the land used for housing.

Today the yard to the north of the station is home to a Light Maintenance Depot used by Chiltern Railways. This is used to stable stock for the peak services from Kidderminster, and is occasionally used to stable engineering vehicles. The land at the south end of platform 1 has a shed for the two Class 139 units that serve the Stourbridge Town branch.

References

Further reading

External links

 Rail Around Birmingham and the West Midlands: Stourbridge Junction railway station
 Railways in Worcestershire
 Re-open the Stourbridge-Dudley Line
 S.L.U.G (Stourbridge Line Users Group)
 Twitter account of George The Stourbridge Junction Station Cat

Railway stations in Dudley
DfT Category D stations
Former Great Western Railway stations
Railway stations in Great Britain opened in 1852
Railway stations in Great Britain closed in 1901
Railway stations in Great Britain opened in 1901
Railway stations served by Chiltern Railways
Railway stations served by West Midlands Trains
Rail junctions in England
Stourbridge
1852 establishments in England